Mark Anstey is a former Welsh international lawn and indoor bowler.

He won a bronze medal in the fours with Dai Wilkins, Ian Slade and Neil Rees at the 1998 Commonwealth Games in Kuala Lumpur.

He is a two times Welsh National Champion, winning the fours in 1988 and 1989, when bowling for the Abergavenny Bowls Club. He is also a former Welsh indoor national champion.

References

Living people
Commonwealth Games bronze medallists for Wales
Bowls players at the 1998 Commonwealth Games
Welsh male bowls players
Commonwealth Games medallists in lawn bowls
Year of birth missing (living people)
Medallists at the 1998 Commonwealth Games